Martin Muwanga (born October 20, 1983) is a Ugandan football striker. He currently plays for the Ugandan Premier League club Uganda Revenue Authority SC.

Career 
Muwanga began his career with Police Jinja in the Ugandan Premier League, before moving to ATRACO FC in 2006 and then to Uganda Revenue Authority SC in 2008.

International career 
He played from 2004 to 2005 two games for the Uganda national football team.

External links

1983 births
Ugandan footballers
Uganda international footballers
Living people
Ugandan expatriate sportspeople in Rwanda
Association football forwards
Expatriate footballers in Rwanda
ATRACO F.C. players